The Texas Civil War Museum, located in White Settlement, a suburb of Fort Worth, opened in 2006. It is the largest Civil War museum west of the Mississippi River. It consists of three separate galleries. The first displays a Civil War collection which is primarily military, with special emphasis on flags. The second displays a Victorian dress collection, and the third the United Daughters of the Confederacy (UDC) Texas Confederate collection. The UDC has one of three seats on the Museum's board.

Some of its collection came from the former Texas Confederate Museum in Austin, owned and curated by the UDC. The remainder is from the man who built the museum and is its president and curator, Texas oilman Ray Richey. "Experts say [it] is the finest private collection in existence." His collection is primarily military in nature. Also on display are Victorian dresses collected by his wife Judy, who is curator of the dress collection.

Officially the Museum presents both sides of the war; the gift shop has Union items on one side, and Confederate items on the other. However, the Museum has been criticized in the press for being "an advocate and apologist for the Confederacy." According to John Fullinwider, a "Dallas educator and activist", the museum presents the Lost Cause view of the Civil War; its movie, "Our Honor, Our Rights: Texas and Texans in the Civil War" is "romanticized", "a lovely bit of 'Lost Cause' propaganda". In it, the "sectional crisis" is presented as a contest over states' rights rather than slavery. The author of the text of the movie, McMurry University professor Donald S. Frazier, says that it needs to be updated, because "the conversation has changed". The facility sometimes refers to the Civil War as the War Between the States, the name preferred by Confederate sympathizers. The Museum's Web site links to book reviews signed by its "Resident Historian", "Johnny Reb".

Dallas, wishing to dispose of its Robert E. Lee statue, considered lending it to the museum, the only local institution that was willing to accept it. The city decided not to lend it because it would not be displayed in its proper context, according to the city.

References

Further reading

External links
 Museum’s Web page

United Daughters of the Confederacy
American Civil War museums in Texas
Tourist attractions in Tarrant County, Texas
Buildings and structures in Tarrant County, Texas
Museums in Tarrant County, Texas
Museums established in 2006
2006 establishments in Texas
Lost Cause of the Confederacy
Military and war museums in Texas
Confederate States of America monuments and memorials in Texas